Jean Roatta (born 13 December 1941 in Marseille) was the deputy for Bouches-du-Rhône's 3rd constituency in the National Assembly of France from 1993 to 2012, as a member of Union for French Democracy and then the Union for a Popular Movement.

References

1941 births
Living people
Politicians from Marseille
French people of Italian descent
Republican Party (France) politicians
Union for French Democracy politicians
Liberal Democracy (France) politicians
Union for a Popular Movement politicians
The Popular Right
MEPs for France 2009–2014
Deputies of the 11th National Assembly of the French Fifth Republic
Deputies of the 12th National Assembly of the French Fifth Republic
Deputies of the 13th National Assembly of the French Fifth Republic